Doctor Lisa is a 2020 Russian biographical drama film directed by Oksana Karas, about Elizabeth Glinka, a Russian humanitarian worker and charity activist.

Plot 
The plot is of one day in the life of Elizabeth Glinka who is the head of Fair Care Foundation in Moscow in 2012. As the day starts, Elizabeth and her husband Gleb Glebovich Glinka are going to celebrate their 30th wedding anniversary. Elizabeth is waiting for her three sons and close friends to arrive. 

Before the party, the last thing she needs to do is drop by Moscow Paveletsky Railway Station to check on weekly patients at the Fair Care fund and to send humanitarian supplies to people in need. 

At the clinic, a man calls Doctor Lisa. In a hospital in the Moscow suburbs his five-year-old girl, Eva, who is dying. The doctor on duty has to discharge Eva. Due to medical formalities the child, who suffers from cancer, is left without painkillers. Doctor Lisa agrees to help. 

This request results in Doctor Lisa breaking the law for this girl.

Production 
Filming began in Moscow in April 2019.

Elizaveta Glinka's widower Gleb Glinka,who acted as a consultant to the filmmakers, starred in the role as a man at the station.

The premiere took place on September 13, 2020 at the Kinotavr 2020 festival.

Cast and crew 

 Stage director: Oksana Karas
 Author of the script: Alexey Ilyushkin, Natalya Kudryashova , Oksana Karas , Alyona Sanko
 Director of photography: Sergey Machilsky , RGC
 Production Designer: Pavel Parkhomenko
 Composer: Yuri Poteenko
 Costume Designers: Ulyana Ryabova, Oleg Matrokhin
 Make-up artist: Anastasia Agaltsova
 Prop assistants: Tatyana Gordon, Maxim Sklyarov
 Casting director: Polina Mashinistova
 Director: Maxim Malinin
 Planning director: Elena Cherednichenko
 Editing directors: Vladimir Voronin, Olga Proshkina
 Sound engineer: Ivan Rips
 Second operator: Nikita Poznyansky
 Technical Director: Evgeniy Ryzhonkov
 Artist-decorator: Nikolai Alekseev, Sergey Shcherban, Mikhail Zubarev
 Music editor: Anastasia Zdeb
 Second directors: Tatyana Kolkova, Maria Libova
 Invoicing artist: Elizaveta Sorokoumovskaya
 Making plastic makeup: Alexey Ivchenko
 Key flu: Avtandil Iskandarov
 Playback operator: Vadim Martynenko
 Steadicam: Alexander Vdovenko
 Dolly: Alexander Vorobyov, Georgy Berdyugin
 Aerial filming: Air Cinema
 Stunt coordinator: Oleg Chemodurov
 Photographer: Alina Cherednychenko
 Location Manager: Ekaterina Gusarevich
 Executive Producer: Stanislav Botin
 Film director: Maria Botina
 Producers: Maria Ionova, Irina Borisova, Alexey Akhmedov, Tatyana Lukyanova
 Post-production producer: Tatyana Lukyanova
 Re-recording sound engineers: Ivan Rips, Vsevolod Vedyakin
 Noise design: Vsevolod Vedyakin
 Producer of  NTV : Marina Shcherbacheva
 Co-producers: Vadim Ostrovsky , Ravil Salikhov
 Project producer: Alexander Bondarev
 General Producers: Rafael Minasbekyan , Janik Faiziev , Timur Weinstein and Alexey Zemsk

Awards and nominations
2021 Golden Unicorn Awards: nominated for Best Film award.
 2021 - Golden Eagle Award (Russia) - Best music (Yuri Poteyenko).
 2021 - Nika Award - Best Actress (Chulpan Khamatova).
 2021 - Nika Award - Best Supporting Actress (Tatyana Dogileva).
 2020 - Kinotavr - Audience award.
 2020 - VECHE XIV All-Russian Film Festival of Historical Films - Best Director (Oksana Karas).
 2020 - VECHE XIV All-Russian Film Festival of Historical Films - "Prize of the Governor of the Novgorod Region"

References

External links 
 
 Anton Dolin. "Doctor Lisa" is a human rights blockbuster about a modern-day saint. Meduza (October 22, 2020).
 Sevolod Korshunov. everyone in, don't let anyone out: Doctor Lisa has all emotions under control. The Art of Cinema (September 13, 2020).

2020 films
2020s Russian-language films
2020 biographical drama films
Russian biographical drama films
Biographical films about physicians